Amelia Sach (1873 – 3 February 1903) and Annie Walters (1869 – 3 February 1903) were two British murderers better known as the Finchley baby farmers.

Background

Little is known about Annie Walters, but Sach's background is well-documented: Amelia Sach was baptised Frances Amelia Thorne in Hampreston, Dorset, on 5 May 1867. She was the fourth child of ten and had three sisters. She married a builder called Jeffrey Sach in 1896. Sach was active long before she engaged Walters. By 1902 she was working from 'Claymore House', a semi-detached, red-brick villa in East Finchley, North London. Sach was a qualified midwife

Sach was herself a mother; the England and Wales census of 1901 shows that a daughter named Lilian was born to her in Clapham. She lied about her age – she was 32, not 29. Walters' background is unknown, but she had been married. She seems to have had a drinking problem and she would periodically advertise herself as a sick nurse. On her arrest she was determined to be "feeble", that is to say, feeble-minded.

There is a small possibility that the pair may have been involved in an earlier homicide that resulted in another woman being executed.  In 1899, Louise Masset was tried for the murder of her young son Manfred, whose body was found in the ladies' lavatory at Dalston Junction railway station. Circumstantial evidence suggested that Louise was the murderer, and the killing was to be rid of a supposed encumbrance due to her wanting to marry a man named Lucas.  However, in her claims of innocence, Louise said she had taken Manfred out of the care of one woman to give him to two ladies she met who had an establishment for the care of growing children.  The police claimed they made some effort in looking for the two women, but the extent of their investigation is unknown.  In any event, Louise Masset was tried and convicted of the murder and, despite a petition for mercy, was executed on 9 January 1900.

Crimes
Amelia Sach operated a "lying-in" home in Stanley Road and later at Claymore House in Hertford Road (both in East Finchley), London. Around 1900, she began to advertise that babies "could be left" and took money for adoptions. The clients, judging from the witness accounts, were mostly servants from local houses who had become pregnant, and who had employers who were keen for the matter to be resolved discreetly. There was a charge for lying-in and another for adoption, a "present" to future parents of between £25 and £30.

Annie Walters would collect the baby after it was born, then murder it with a poisonous mixture: chlorodyne (a medicine containing morphine).

They were caught after Walters raised the suspicions of her landlord in Islington who was a police officer. An unknown number of babies were murdered this way, although the figure is considered to be in excess of a dozen. During their trial at the Old Bailey, the quantity of baby clothes found at Claymore House was used as evidence to indicate the sheer scale of their crimes. A local campaign to have their sentences commuted to life failed, and they became the first women to be hanged at Holloway on 3 February 1903, by William Billington, in what was the only double-hanging of women to be carried out in modern times.

Aftermath

The bodies of Sach and Walters were buried in unmarked graves within the walls of Holloway Prison, as was customary. In 1971 the prison underwent an extensive programme of rebuilding, during which the bodies of all the executed women were exhumed. With the exception of Ruth Ellis, the remains of the four other women executed at Holloway (i.e. Styllou Christofi, Edith Thompson, Sach and Walters) were subsequently reburied in a single grave (plot 117) at Brookwood Cemetery. The grave is marked with a horizontally laid grey granite tombstone, and the names of all the occupants are engraved on it. The remains of Thompson were exhumed in 2018 and laid to rest in the grave of her mother and father in the City of London Cemetery.

In popular culture
The plot of Nicola Upson's novel Two for Sorrow (2010, Faber & Faber, London; Harper, New York) revolves around the aftermath of the Finchley Baby Farming affair. Both Sach and Walters appear as characters.

See also
 List of serial killers in the United Kingdom

References

Books
 Jesse, F. Tennyson Murder and Its Motives (Garden City, New York, Doubleday & Company—Dolphin Books, 1924, 1958, 1965), 240p.  The book's introduction has a section on the "Baby Farming" murder cases, including 3 pages on Sachs and Walters—p. 32–34 in this edition.

1903 deaths
20th-century executions by England and Wales
Criminal duos
Burials at Brookwood Cemetery
English murderers of children
English people convicted of murder
English serial killers
Executed British female serial killers
Executed English people
Executed English women
People convicted of murder by England and Wales
Place of birth unknown
Poisoners
Baby farming